Nicolae Georgescu (1 January 1936 – 22 August 1983) was a Romanian footballer who played as a attacking midfielder.

Club career
Nicolae Georgescu was born 1 January 1936 in Câmpina, Romania and started to play football in 1950 at local club Rafinăria, afterwards in 1954 moving at Voința București in Divizia B, after one year moving at fellow Divizia B club, Progresul CPCS București. On 25 March 1956 he made his Divizia A debut for Rapid București in a 0–0 away against Locomotiva Timișoara. He spent 10 seasons at Rapid in which he helped the club win the 1966–67 Divizia A which was the first title in the club's history, being used by coach Valentin Stănescu in 6 matches. He also reached two Cupa României finals in 1961 and 1962 which were lost in front of Arieșul Turda against whom he scored a goal respectively Steaua București and won two Balkans Cup in 1964 and 1966. He made his last Divizia A appearance on 2 October 1966 in a 2–1 away loss against Dinamo București, having a total of 211 appearances and 46 goals scored in the competition, retiring after playing two more seasons at Poiana Câmpina in Divizia B. Nicolae Georgescu died on 22 August 1983 at age 47.

International career
Nicolae Georgescu played 13 matches and scored 7 goals for Romania, making his debut on 29 May 1955 under coach Gheorghe Popescu I in a friendly which ended 2–2 against Poland in which he scored the last goal of the match. His last three appearances for the national team were at the 1966 World Cup qualifiers, being the team's captain in two of them and scored a goal in each leg against Turkey. He also played for Romania's Olympic team, and participated at the 1964 Summer Olympics in Tokyo where he played two games, helping the team finish in the 5th place.

International goals
Scores and results list Romania's goal tally first. "Score" column indicates the score after each Nicolae Georgescu goal.

Honours
Rapid București
Divizia A: 1966–67
Cupa României runner-up: 1960–61, 1961–62
Balkans Cup: 1963–64, 1964–66

Notes

References

External links

1936 births
1983 deaths
Romanian footballers
Romania international footballers
Olympic footballers of Romania
Footballers at the 1964 Summer Olympics
FC Progresul București players
FC Rapid București players
FCM Câmpina players
Liga I players
Liga II players
People from Câmpina
Association football midfielders